Girish Chandra Yadav (born October 1, 1974) is an Indian politician serving as the State Minister (Independent charge) in the Government of Uttar Pradesh.  Born in Samaspur, Paniaria in Jaunpur,  Mr. Yadav married Smt. Sanju Yadav in 1990, and together they have a son and two daughters.

Mr. Yadav is member of the Bharatiya Janata Party and is a sitting member of the U.P. Vidhan Sabha (lower house of the state legislature).  Mr. Yadav is an agriculturist by profession and has a special interest in social service.  He holds three bachelors degrees: in Science, Education, Law.

Political career
Girish Chandra Yadav was appointed to the cabinet of Yogi Adityanath in March 2017.  He serves as the incumbent Minister of State for Sport And Youth Welfare.

Social media
Girish Chandra Yadav is an active user of social media including Twitter on which he has more than ten thousand followers.  He has written more than two thousand tweets.

See also
 Yogi Adityanath ministry (2017–)

References



Living people
Uttar Pradesh MLAs 2017–2022
Bharatiya Janata Party politicians from Uttar Pradesh
State cabinet ministers of Uttar Pradesh
Yogi ministry
1974 births
Uttar Pradesh MLAs 2022–2027